Igor Fernandes da Silva Araújo (born 6 June 1992), known as Igor Fernandes, is a Brazilian footballer who plays as a left back for São Bernardo.

Career statistics

Honours 
Corinthians
Campeonato Paulista: 2013
Recopa Sudamericana: 2013

Sport Recife
Copa do Nordeste: 2014

Avaí
Campeonato Catarinense: 2019

Remo
Copa Verde: 2021

References

External links
 

Living people
1992 births
Footballers from São Paulo
Brazilian footballers
Association football defenders
Campeonato Brasileiro Série A players
Campeonato Brasileiro Série B players
Campeonato Brasileiro Série C players
Campeonato Brasileiro Série D players
Sport Club Corinthians Paulista players
Associação Atlética Flamengo players
Sport Club do Recife players
Clube Atlético Linense players
Esporte Clube Tigres do Brasil players
Grêmio Novorizontino players
Red Bull Brasil players
ABC Futebol Clube players
Avaí FC players